G-Man at the Yard is a 1946 thriller novel by the British writer Peter Cheyney. It is the final entry in the popular series of novels featuring the FBI agent Lemmy Caution. It was republished posthumously in 1953 following his death in 1951, now also including three short stories. Unlike many other novels by Cheyney it was never made into a film.

Synopsis
Caution heads to London in pursuit of Esmeralda Vandellin, but finds he needs the assistance of Scotland Yard.

References

Bibliography
 James, Russell. Great British Fictional Detectives. Remember When, 21 Apr 2009.
 Reilly, John M. Twentieth Century Crime & Mystery Writers. Springer, 2015.
 Pitts, Michael R. Famous Movie Detectives. Scarecrow Press, 1979.

1946 British novels
Novels by Peter Cheyney
British thriller novels
Novels set in London
British crime novels